Brevista zherichini is a fossil species of beetles in the family Buprestidae, the only species in the genus Brevista.

References

Monotypic Buprestidae genera